La Viuda Negra (The Black Widow) is a 1977 film directed by Arturo Ripstein, produced in Mexico and based on the novel Debiera haber obispas written by  Rafael Solana.

Cast
 Isela Vega as Matea
 Mario Almada as Padre Feliciano
 Sergio Jiménez as The Doctor
 Hilda Aguirre as Úrsula

Plot
In a small town in Mexico, Matea (Isela Vega) is an orphan who assists the priest, Father Feliciano (Mario Almada), in his parish. The village doctor tries to seduce her, but fails and proceeds to defame her into believing that Matea maintains relations with the priest. The people believe him and demand to cure her; he refuses and locks himself away with Matea. During the lockdown, they develop a passionate love, but fate arrives and the priest dies. Matea becomes a kind of priestess which is known as the "Black Widow".

External links
 
 Instituto Mexicano de Cinematografía (IMCINE) (in Spanish)

1977 films
Mexican drama films
1970s Spanish-language films
Films based on Mexican novels
Films directed by Arturo Ripstein
1970s Mexican films